Catimini is a Canadian drama film, directed by Nathalie Saint-Pierre and released in 2012. The film tells the stories of four young girls living as wards of the provincial child protection department.

The cast includes Émilie Bierre as Cathy, Joyce-Tamara Hall as Kayla, Rosine Chouinard-Chauveau as Mégane, Frédérique Paré as Manu, Isabelle Vincent as Réjanne, and Roger La Rue as Raynald.

Brendan Kelly of the Montreal Gazette singled out the performances of the four main child actors for praise, writing that "the four young actors playing the girls are all amazing, so good that you'll be forgiven for thinking Saint-Pierre actually went and cast real kids from the youth protection world, which she did not."

The film premiered on August 24, 2012 at the Angoulême Film Festival, before premiering commercially in January 2013.

Awards

References

External links

2012 films
2012 drama films
Canadian drama films
Films set in Quebec
Films shot in Quebec
French-language Canadian films
2010s Canadian films